Sahib Singh (Gurmukhi: ਸਾਹਿਬ ਸਿੰਘ) (16 February 1892 – 29 October 1977) was a Sikh academic who made a contribution to Sikh literature. He was a grammarian, author, scholar and theologian. He was born in a Hindu family to father Hiranand and was named Natthu Ram.

Early life
As a youth, Natthu Ram was apprenticed to a Muslim teacher, Hayat Shah, son of Punjabi poet Hashim, to teach him the Persian language.

Whilst at junior school, he saw Sikh soldiers and was so impressed with them that he decided to keep unshorn hair. In 1906, when he was in the ninth grade he became Amritdhari and gave himself the name of "Sahib Singh". At that time he stopped learning Persian and started learning Sanskrit, which later on helped him in understanding Guru Granth Sahib.

Later life
After passing the tenth grade, Sahib Singh joined a local school. Later he applied for a job with the postal department, and got the job, borrowing 20 Rs from his house maid as traveling expenses.

Later he left home to pursue higher education. He had nowhere to go, having very little money. He later met Pundit Vesta Parsad, a scholarly teacher for help.

Sahib Singh passed his FA and BA and started work at Frakka college and later joined Gujranwala Khalsa college. It was at this college that he met Bava Harkrishan Singh and Bhai Jodh Singh. Sahib Singh's financial situation had improved by this time so that he was able to pay back his debts.

Employment

The death of his father made the situation hard for him. He entered Dyal Singh College, Lahore, and then the Government College, Lahore where he obtained his bachelor's degree. In 1917 he joined Nanak Khalsa College, Gujranwala as a lecturer in Sanskrit. In 1921 Sahib Singh became the Assistant General Secretary of the SGPC. Sahib Singh took part in Guru Ka Bagh Morcha in 1922 and was arrested. In 1923 he was again arrested when he took part in Jaito Morcha. In 1927 he rejoined Gujranwala college, where he stayed until 1936. At this time he moved to Amritsar and joined the Khalsa college as a lecturer in Punjabi. At the college he met fellow Sikh scholars like Teja Singh, Ganda Singh, Veeram Singh and Mohan Singh. In 1952 he retired from this college to take up a post as Principal at Shaheed Missionary college, Amritsar. In 1962 he left to join his son at Sidhwan Bet near Jagroan. When his son moved to Patiala, he took classes at Gurmat college in Patiala. He was awarded a Doctorate of Letters by Punjabi University, Patiala in 1971.

Health and illness
Sahib Singh was often afflicted with illnesses. He suffered from Parkinson's disease and died on 29 October 1977.

Publications
Sahib Singh wrote extensively in Punjabi, but most of his works have now been translated into English, Hindi and other prominent world languages.

 Savaiye Sri Mukhvak Maihla 5 ate Bhatta De Savaiye Steek (1930)
 Jap Ji Sahib Steek (1931)
 Asa Di Vaar Steek (1933)
 Sad Steek (1935)
 Bhattan de Savaiye Steek (1935)
 Sukhmani Sahib Steek (1939)
 Khulhe Maidan 
 Jaap Sahib Savaiye Chaupai Steek (1944)
 Dasa Varan Steek (1946)
 Salok Te Shabad Farid Ji Steek (1946)
 Dharmic Loka (1946)
 Gurbani Te Itihas Bare (1946)
 Burai Da Takra (1946)
 Salok Guru Angad Sahib Steek (1948)
 Chanan Munare (1949)
 Salok Kabir Ji Steek (1949)
 Satte Balwand Di Var Steek (1949)
 Gurbani Vyakarn (1950)
 Chara Varan Steek (1951)
 Dharam Te Sadachar (1951)
 Sarbat Da Bhala (1951)
 Siddh Gost Steek (1957)
 Bhagat Bani Steek Pahila Hisa (1959)
 Bhagat Bani Steek Duja Hisa (1959)
 Bhagat Bani Steek Tija Hisa (1959)
 Bhagat Bani Steek Chautha Hisa (1960)
 Bhagat Bani Steek Punjvah Hisa (1960)
 Sikh Sidak Na Haare (1962)
 Jeevan Britant – Guru Nanak Dev Ji
 Jeevan Britant – Sri Guru Angad Dev Ji
 Jeevan Britant – Sri Guru Amar Das Ji 
 Jeevan Britant – Sri Guru Ramdas Ji 
 Jeevan Britant – Sri Guru Arjan Dev Ji 
 Sri Guru Granth Sahib Darpan (Dasa Pothiarn) (1965)
 Jeevan Britant – Sri Guru Gobind Singh Ji (1966)
 Jeevan Britant – Sri Guru Hargobind Sahib Ji
 Jeevan Britant – Sri Guru Tegh Bahadur Ji 
 Jeevan Britant – Sri Guru Har Rai Sahib te Sri Guru Harkrishan Sahib
 Gur Itihas Patshahi 2 ton 9 (1968)
 Aad Bir bare (1970)
 Sikh Sidak Na Hare
 Sadachar Lekh (1971)
 Simran Diya Barkata (1971) 
 Barahmaha, Tukhari Te Maajh (1972)
 Meri Jeevan Kahani (1977)

Posthumous
 Nitnem Steek (1979)
 Babania Kahanian (1981)
 Bani Maihla 9 Steek (2003)

See also
Guru Granth Sahib
Sikh Gurus
Sikhism

References

External links
 http://www.sikhsangat.org/2010/10/october-29th-sahib-singh-ji/
 http://www.gurugranthdarpan.net

20th-century Indian linguists
Indian Sikhs
1977 deaths
1892 births
Sikh writers
People from Patiala
Indian religious writers
Punjabi-language writers
Writers from Punjab, India
Converts to Sikhism from Hinduism